B-cell CLL/lymphoma 9 like is a protein that in humans is encoded by the BCL9L gene.

References

Further reading